The netball competition at the 1998 Commonwealth Games took place in Kuala Lumpur, Malaysia from 14 – 21 September 1998. Australia won the gold medal.

Results

Group stages

Group A

Final standings

Group B

Final standings

Semi-finals

Bronze-medal match

Final

Medallists

References

 
1998
netball
1998 in netball
International netball competitions hosted by Malaysia